Isabella "Izzi" Rubi Manfredi (born 1987) is an Australian pop singer, songwriter and activist from Sydney, New South Wales. Manfredi is best known as the former lead vocalist of indie rock band the Preatures. Her debut single "Jealousy" was released on 26 May 2021.

Early life
Isabella Rubi Manfredi was born in 1987 to parents Julie Manfredi and Italian Australian celebrity chef Stefano Manfredi. She was raised in Sydney, New South Wales.

Career

2010–present: The Preatures

Manfredi met Thomas Champion and Jack Moffitt at the Australian Institute of Music in 2008. They formed a band together, and in 2010, added Luke Davison and Gideon Bensen, naming themselves the Preachers.

In 2012, they changed the spelling of their name to the Preatures to avoid legal complications with other bands with similar names, signed with Mercury Records and released the EP Shaking Hands. The EP featured the single "Take a Card", written by Manfredi with Bensen on lead vocals. It was featured on Triple J Unearthed.

In 2013, they released a second extended play, Is This How You Feel?, which was preceded by two singles, "Is This How You Feel?" and "Manic Baby". "Is This How You Feel?" attracted considerable success, winning the $50,000 Vanda & Young Global Songwriting Competition, receiving an ARIA Award nomination for Best Pop Release, and being voted ninth in Triple J's Hottest 100 of 2013.

Blue Planet Eyes, their debut studio album, was released on 30 September 2014. Blue Planet Eyes peaked at number 4 on the ARIA Albums Chart. At the 2015 ARIA Music Awards, the group received nominations in three categories.

Their second and final studio album, Girlhood, was released on 11 August 2017 via Island Records Australia. Girlhood received an ARIA Award nomination for Best Rock Album.

2019–present: Debut studio album izzi
On 3 December 2019, Manfredi was announced as the recipient of the Mushroom Music Publishing Recording Grant, winning $10,000 towards the recording of her debut album. Manfredi is the seventh artist to take out the grant, following previous recipients such as Hatchie, D.D Dumbo and Rolling Blackouts Coastal Fever. On 26 May 2021, Manfredi released her debut solo single "Jealousy". On 12 November 2021, Manfredi released "One Hit Wonder".

In July 2022, Manfredi released "Naive" and announced the forthcoming release of her debut studio album, izzi, scheduled for release on 2 September 2022.

Personal life
On 27 January 2021, Manfredi revealed her pregnancy and engagement to musician and creative technologist Rupert Parry.

Manfredi is a supporter of the Keep Sydney Open campaign.

Discography

Studio albums

Soundtrack albums

Live albums

Singles

As lead artist

Guest appearances

Awards and nominations

APRA Awards
The APRA Awards are presented annually from 1982 by the Australasian Performing Right Association (APRA), "honouring composers and songwriters". They commenced in 1982.

! 
|-
| rowspan="2"| 2015 
| "Somebody's Talking" (Gideon Bensen, Thomas Champion, Luke Davison, Isabella Manfredi, Jack Mofitt)
| Song of the Year
| 
| 
|-
| The Preatures (Gideon Bensen, Thomas Champion, Luke Davison, Isabella Manfredi, Jack Mofitt)
| Breakthrough Songwriter of the Year
| 
| 
|-

Vanda & Young Global Songwriting Competition
The Vanda & Young Global Songwriting Competition is an annual competition that "acknowledges great songwriting whilst supporting and raising money for Nordoff-Robbins"; it is coordinated by Albert Music and APRA AMCOS. It commenced in 2009.

! 
|-
! scope="row"| 2013
| Isabella Manfredi for "Is This How You Feel?"
| Vanda & Young Global Songwriting Competition
| style="background:gold; text-align:center;"| 1st
| 
|}

References

External links
 
 

1987 births
Australian people of Italian descent
Australian women singer-songwriters
Australian indie rock musicians
Australian pop musicians
Living people